Tom Forber is a professional rugby league footballer who plays as a  for Whitehaven RLFC in RFL Championship, on a short-term loan from the Wigan Warriors in the Betfred Super League.

He has spent time on loan from Wigan at Oldham in Betfred League 1 and the Newcastle Thunder in the Betfred Championship.

In 2022 Forber made his Super League début for the Warriors against Hull Kingston Rovers.

References

External links
SL profile

2003 births
Living people
English rugby league players
Newcastle Thunder players
Oldham R.L.F.C. players
Rugby league hookers
Whitehaven R.L.F.C. players
Wigan Warriors players